Nickelodeon was a Russian language children's television channel launched on November 15, 1998, across the Post-Soviet states.

The high-definition simulcast started broadcasting on October 4, 2011, becoming the first kids channel throughout the CIS countries to broadcast in HD.

History

1993–1998 
On September 1, 1993, Nickelodeon UK began broadcasting in Europe and the western part of Russia from the Astra 1C and Astra 1B satellites. Broadcasting was from 9:00 to 22:00 MSK. Since 1996, Nickelodeon UK has broadcast from the Sirius satellite for the western and north-western part of Russia.

1998–2022 
On September 16, 1998 Nickelodeon International signed an agreement with Metromedia International Group. MIG was engaged in localization of the channel into Russian, the editorial office was located on 2nd Brestskaya Street, in house No. 43 (Moscow). The presentation of the channel in the newspaper media and some Moscow schools also began.

On November 15, 1998, Nickelodeon Russia began broadcasting around the clock in the CIS and Baltic countries, having two audio tracks broadcasting languages (Russian and English). Dubbing is done in Moscow. Initially, cassettes with recordings were sent to Moscow, after which the material was dubbed, and the cassettes were returned to London, from there broadcasting is still going on. In the same year, three thematic blocks appeared: "Nicktoons", "Nick at Nite" and "Nick Jr". According to statistics from June 1999, the channel was already received by 30,000 households in the cable networks of Arkhangelsk.

In 2000, the educational program "ME TV" was presented, which told about the cultural and national traditions of the CIS and Baltic countries. The Moscow office also developed a program for Poland.

In 2001, a website was launched - Nickelodeon.ru. In 2002, 2 more new blocks appeared: "Nick Films" and "Toons on toast". In 2003, the channel began broadcasting on the territory of Ukraine. In September 2003, MTV Networks International signed an agreement with EMC, the new distributor continued to localize and adapt the channel.

In May 2004, the channel was delocalized and replaced by Nickelodeon Europe. Now broadcasting was carried out throughout Eastern Europe, and a Hungarian soundtrack was also added. In 2006, Media Broadcasting Group became the distributor of the channel in the CIS. In the same year, 2 new blocks "Nick Zone" and "Nick Double" appeared, which offered additional series of animated series.

From 2008 to 2012, the channel periodically experienced failures on the air, including with a sound track, as a result of which animated series in Polish and English were released for some time period.

On March 1, 2010, a new corporate identity and logo were introduced, as well as a new design. In the same year, the broadcasting center moved from Warsaw, London to Prague, but Warsaw and London was responsible for programming and controlling the channel.

At the beginning of 2011, a representative office of Viacom opened in Russia, which began distributing the local version of the channel. On September 17, 2011, Nickelodeon switched to widescreen broadcasting (16:9). On October 4, 2011, Nickelodeon Europe switched to HD format. This TV channel in some countries, including the CIS, is referred to as Nickelodeon HD. After that, it began broadcasting as the main channel of Nickelodeon Poland with a Russian soundtrack, this version was also delocalized for international broadcasting, Amsterdam took over programming of the channel.

In October 2012, the channel separated from the Polish version and was localized again, and its own program of programs also appeared. For some time, the broadcast continued to go from Warsaw and Prague, later moved to London.

In 2013, the blocks "Family Friday" and "Old School" appeared, consisting of classic animated series of the TV channel.

In 2014, Nickelodeon and the Aeroplane production company signed a license agreement for the animated series The Fixies, under which the TV channel has broadcast an animated series for preschoolers for two years since January 2015.

Since January 1, 2015, the channel has been broadcasting without advertising. In the summer of 2015, the updated website of the TV channel was presented, the audience of the site exceeded 650,000 unique users for the second quarter of 2015. In 2016, the block "Sunday Block Premier" appeared.

In 2017, Moscow took over programming of the TV channel, but broadcasting continues from Warsaw and London. Also, audio tracks in Lithuanian, Latvian and Estonian were added for the Baltic countries. Since June 1, 2017, the channel has been called abbreviated ("Nick").

At the beginning of 2020, Okko and ViacomCBS Networks Russia signed a deal under which the online cinema received the rights to the content of the Nickelodeon, Nick Jr, Comedy Central, Channel 5 and MTV brands. On June 1, 2020, Paramount+ was launched in the Okko service. On June 1, 2021, a similar service was launched in ivi, but under the name Paramount Play.

On April 1, 2022, the Nickelodeon Ukraine TV channel began broadcasting in Poland and Germany, previously this TV channel broadcast on the streaming service PlutoTV. On the territory of Ukraine, at the same time, the Russian-language version of the TV channel continued to broadcast on cable and satellite networks. The channel closed in Russia on April 28 of that year due to Paramount pausing operations in that country in response to the Russian invasion of Ukraine. In the Commonwealth of Independent States (CIS), as well as Georgia, Ukraine the broadcasting of Russian-language versions of MTV and other Paramount channels continued until December 14.

From December 14, 2022, the broadcasting of Nickelodeon and affiliated TV channels in Belarus will stop. And on the same day, the broadcasting of the TV channel was completely stopped in Belarus and CIS countries and was replaced with Nickelodeon CEE (except Russia and Belarus).

Censorship
Episodes of The Loud House featuring Howard and Harold McBride, Luna, Sam, Lainey and Alice were removed from broadcast due to the nation's domestic anti-gay propaganda law.

Programming

See also 

 Nickelodeon

References

External links

Russia
Russian animation
Children's television networks
Defunct television channels in Russia
Television channels and stations established in 1998
Television channels and stations disestablished in 2022
1998 establishments in Russia
Television stations in Georgia (country)
Television stations in Tajikistan
Television stations in Belarus
Television stations in Turkmenistan
Television stations in Kyrgyzstan
Television stations in Armenia
Television stations in Azerbaijan
Television channels in Moldova
Television stations in Kazakhstan
Television stations in Ukraine
Russian-language television stations
English-language television stations
Television stations in Uzbekistan